is a song by Japanese singer songwriter Mai Kuraki, taken from her third compilation album Mai Kuraki Best 151A: Love & Hope (2014). It was released on August 27, 2014, and served as the theme song to the Japanese animation Case Closed. It was released as a double-A side with "Stand by You".

Music video
A short version of the official music video was first released on Kuraki's official YouTube account on October 10, 2014. As of August 2022, it has received over 1,090,000 views on YouTube.

Track listing

Charts

Weekly charts

Monthly charts

Year-end charts

Certification and sales

|-
! scope="row"| Japan (RIAJ)
| 
| 29,517 
|-
|}

Release history

References

2014 singles
Mai Kuraki songs
Songs written by Mai Kuraki
2014 songs
Case Closed songs
Song recordings produced by Daiko Nagato